In Seventh-day Adventist theology, the Great Controversy theme refers to the cosmic battle between Jesus Christ and Satan, also played out on earth. Ellen G. White, a member of the Seventh-day Adventist Church, who wrote several books explaining, but never disagreeing with the Bible, delineates the theme in her book The Great Controversy, first published in 1858. The concept, or metanarrative, derives from many visions the author reported to have received, as well as from scriptural references.  Adventist theology sees the concept as important in that it provides an understanding of the origin of evil, and of the eventual destruction of evil and the restoration of God's original purpose for this world. It constitutes belief number 8 of the church's 28 Fundamentals.

Adventist Theologian Herbert E. Douglass writes that Calvinistic-leaning Christians view this theme and the Adventist movement that produced it as heterodox.

Official position
One of the 28 fundamental beliefs of Seventh-day Adventists states:
8. Great Controversy:
All humanity is now involved in a great controversy between Christ and Satan regarding the character of God, His law, and His sovereignty over the universe. This conflict originated in heaven when a created being, endowed with freedom of choice, in self-exaltation became Satan, God's adversary. He led into rebellion a portion of the angels. He introduced the spirit of rebellion into this world when he led Adam and Eve into sin. This human sin resulted in the distortion of the image of God in humanity, the disordering of the created world, and its eventual devastation at the time of the worldwide flood. Observed by the whole creation, this world became the arena of the universal conflict, out of which the God of love will ultimately be vindicated. To assist His people in this controversy, Christ sends the Holy Spirit and the loyal angels to guide, protect, and sustain them in the way of salvation. (Rev. 12:4–9; Isa. 14:12–14; Eze. 28:12–18; Gen. 3; Rom. 1:19–32; 5:12–21; 8:19–22; Gen. 6–8; 2 Peter 3:6; 1 Cor. 4:9; Heb. 1:14.)

The Great Controversy on the end time

Seventh-day Adventists regard The Great Controversy as one of Ellen White's important works. In it she writes of the perfection of those who stand at the end while Christ still intercedes in the Most Holy Place:

"Now, while our great High Priest is making the atonement for us, we should seek to become perfect in Christ.  Not even by a thought could our Saviour be brought to yield to the power of temptation. . . .  This is the condition in which those must be found who shall stand in the time of trouble." (GC 623).

The urgency for attaining perfection comes from the knowledge that the remnant must live perfectly during the "time of trouble" at the end to prove to the universe that fallen human beings can keep the law of God.  Ellen White states, "When He leaves the sanctuary, darkness covers the inhabitants of the earth. In that fearful time the righteous must live in the sight of a holy God without an intercessor." (GC 614).

She explains this is necessary because the "earthliness" of the remnant must be cleansed that the image of Christ may be perfectly reflected: 
"God's love for His children during the period of their severest trial is as strong and tender as in the days of their sunniest prosperity; but it is needful for them to be placed in the furnace of fire; their earthliness must be consumed, that the image of Christ may be perfectly reflected."(GC 621).

White emphasizes that attaining God's blessing will mean denying self:
"Those who are unwilling to deny self, to agonize before God, to pray long and earnestly for His blessing, will not obtain it.  Wrestling with God–how few know what it is!" (GC 621).

Ellen White in The Great Controversy and in her other writings does not link perfection to something that happens from the believer, but with what God does for the believer through Christ. She states that those who try to trust in their own righteousness cannot understand how it comes through Christ.

Other commentary
Clifford Goldstein describes hearing "the Great Controversy from an unlikely source". In a lecture from The Teaching Company by philosopher and "agnostic Episcopalian" James Hall, Goldstein perceived him teaching "basically, the great controversy scenario, pretty much how any traditional Adventist would."

See also
 The Great Controversy (book)
 Seventh-day Adventist theology
 Seventh-day Adventist eschatology
 28 Fundamentals
 Ellen G. White

References

External links
 "The Great Controversy", chapter 8 in Seventh-day Adventists Believe... A Biblical Exposition of 27 Fundamental Doctrines, by the Ministerial Association
 "A Cosmic Struggle: We’re all involved and we all must decide" by Douglas Matacio. Adventist World
 The Great Controversy by Ellen White from the Ellen G. White Estate

Seventh-day Adventist theology